This is an incomplete list of Dutch expressions used in English; some are relatively common (e.g. cookie), some are comparatively rare. In a survey by Joseph M. Williams in Origins of the English Language it is estimated that about 1% of English words are of Dutch origin.

In many cases the loanword has assumed a meaning substantially different from its Dutch forebear. Some English words have been borrowed directly from Dutch. But typically, English spellings of Dutch loanwords suppress combinations of vowels of the original word which do not exist in English and replace them with existing vowel combinations respectively. For example, the oe in koekje or koekie becomes oo in cookie, the ij (considered a vowel in Dutch) and the ui in vrijbuiter becomes ee and oo in freebooter, the aa in baas becomes o in boss, the oo in stoof becomes o in stove.

As languages, English and Dutch are both West Germanic, and descend further back from the common ancestor language Proto-Germanic. Their relationship however, has been obscured by the lexical influence of Old Norse as a consequence of Viking expansion from the 9th till the 11th century, and Norman French, as a consequence of the Norman conquest of England in 1066. Because of their close common relationship - in addition to the large Latin and French vocabulary both languages possess - many English words are essentially identical to their Dutch lexical counterparts, either in spelling (plant, begin, fruit), pronunciation (pool = pole, boek = book, diep = deep), or both (offer, hard, lip) or as false friends (ramp = disaster, roof = robbery, mop =  joke). These cognates or in other ways related words are excluded from this list.

Dutch expressions have been incorporated into English usage for many reasons and in different periods in time. These are some of the most common ones:

From Old Dutch 
 Many Latinate words in the English lexicon were borrowed from Latin. Quite a few of these words can further trace their origins back to a Germanic source - usually Old Low Franconian. Old Dutch is the western variant of this language. In cases it is not clear whether the loanword is from Old Dutch (Old West Low Franconian) or another Germanic language, they have been excluded from the list. See also: List of English Latinates of Germanic origin
 Since speakers of West Germanic languages spoken along the North Sea coast from the 5th to the 9th century lived close enough together to form a linguistic crossroads - water was the main way of transportation - Dutch and English share some traits that other West Germanic languages do not possess. Lexical examples are Dutch vijf / English five (compare German: Fünf) and Dutch leef / English live (compare German Leben). These words have been excluded from the list. See also: Ingvaeonic nasal spirant law
 Since the Norman conquest of 1066 many Latinate words entered the English lexicon via French, which has – via Old French – a substantial base of Old Dutch (or Old Low Franconian) and Middle Dutch. For instance, French boulevard comes from Dutch bolwerk. In cases it is not clear whether the loanword in French is from Dutch or another Germanic language, they have been excluded from the list. See also: Influence of Franconian language on French
For some loanwords stemming from this period it is not always clear whether they are of Old Dutch, Old Norse, another Germanic language or an unknown Old English origin. These words have been excluded from the list, or indicated as such.

From Middle Dutch 
 About one-third of the invading Norman army of 1066 came from Dutch speaking Flanders. Many Flemings stayed in England after the Conquest and influenced the English language.
 The main part of refugees to England, Wales and Scotland from the 11th till the 17th century were from the Low Countries; particularly Flemish skilled weavers and textile workers immigrated as a result of floods, overpopulation and warfare in Flanders. In 1527, when England's population numbered 5 million, London alone had tens of thousands of Flemings, while an estimated third of the Scottish population has a Flemish background.
The Hanseatic League had in the late Middle Ages a trade network along the coast of Northern Europe and England, using to Dutch related Middle Low German as lingua franca. Some loanwords from this period could come from either language. These words have been excluded from the list, or indicated as such.

From Modern Dutch 
 In the Dutch Golden Age, spanning most of the 17th century, Dutch trade, science, military, and art were among the most acclaimed in the world, and many English words of Dutch origin concerning these areas are stemming from this period.
 English and Dutch rivalry at sea resulted in many Dutch naval terms in English. See also: Dutch linguistic influence on naval terms
 Via settlements in North America and elsewhere in the world Dutch language influenced English spoken there, particularly American English. That resulted also in numerous place names based on Dutch words and places. These are excluded from the list unless they are well known, like Brooklyn (from the Dutch town Breukelen) and Wall Street (from Dutch Walstraat). See also: List of place names of Dutch origin
 Due to contact between Afrikaans and English speakers in South Africa, many Dutch words entered English via Afrikaans, which has an estimated 90 to 95% vocabulary of Dutch origin. Only the words that entered standard English are listed here. Afrikaans words that do not stem from Cape Dutch but from an African, Indian or other European language, are not listed here. See also: List of English words of Afrikaans origin and List of South African slang words



A
 Aardvark  from South African Dutch aardvark (earth + pig)
 Afrikaans  from Dutch Afrikaans (Africanish)
 Aloof  from Old French lof, based on Middle Dutch lof (windward direction) + Middle English a
 Apartheid  from Afrikaans Apartheid, from Dutch apart + suffix -heid (separate + -hood)
 Avast  from 17th century Dutch hou'vast (hold fast, hold steady)

B
 Bamboo  from 16th century Dutch bamboe, based on Malay mambu
 Batik  from Dutch batik, based on Javanese amba + titik (to write + dot, point)
 Bazooka  from US slang bazoo (mouth), based on Dutch bazuin (trompet)
 Beaker  from either Old Norse bikarr or Middle Dutch beker (mug, cup)
 Beleaguer  from 16th century Dutch belegeren (besiege)
 Berm  from French berme, based on Old Dutch b(a)erm
 Bicker  from Middle Dutch bicken (to slash, attack) + Middle English frequentative suffix -er
 Blare  from an unrecorded Old English *blæren or from Middle Dutch blaren and blèren (to bleat, to shout)
 Blasé  via French blasé, past participle of blaser (="to satiate"), perhaps from Dutch blazen (="to blow"), with a sense of "puffed up under the effects of drinking" 
 Blaze (to make public, often in a bad sense, boastfully)  from Middle Dutch blasen (="to blow, on a trumpet) 
 Blink  perhaps from Middle Dutch blinken (="to glitter") 
 Blister  via Old French blestre, perhaps from a Scandinavian source or from Middle Dutch blyster (="swelling") 
 Block (solid piece)  via Old French bloc (="log, block"), from Middle Dutch blok (="trunk of a tree")
 Bluff (poker term)  from Dutch bluffen (="to brag, boast") or verbluffen (="to baffle, mislead") 
 Bluff (landscape feature)  from Dutch blaf (="flat, broad"), apparently a North Sea nautical term for ships with flat vertical bows, later extended to landscape features 
 Blunderbuss  from Dutch donderbus, from donder (="thunder") + bus (="gun," originally "box, tube"), altered by resemblance to blunder 
 Boer (Dutch colonist in South Africa)  from Dutch boer (="farmer"), from Middle Dutch 
 Bogart after Humphrey Bogart. Boomgaard means "orchard" ("tree-garden").
 Bokkoms  from Dutch bokking (="buckling"), a type of salter fish
 Boodle  from Dutch boedel (="property") 
 Boom  from boom (="tree"); cognate to English beam
 Boomslang  from boomslang (="tree snake"), a type of snake
 Booze  from Middle Dutch busen (="to drink in excess");  according to JW de Vries busen is equivalent to buizen 
 Boss  from baas 
 Boulevard  from "bolwerk", which came as boulevard into French, then into English. "Bolwerk" was also directly borrowed as 'bulwark'
 Bow (front of a ship)  from Old Norse bogr, Low German boog or Dutch boeg 
 Brackish  from Middle Dutch or Low German brac (="salty", also "worthless")
 Brandy (wine) from brandewijn (literally "burnt wine") 
 Brooklyn after the town of Breukelen near Utrecht
 Bruin/Bruins  archaic English word for brown bear, derived from the Dutch word for brown bruin
 Buckwheatfrom Middle Dutch boecweite (="beech wheat") because of its resemblance to grains and seed of beech wheat
 Bully  from boel (="lover", "brother").
 Bulwark  from bolwerk 
 Bumpkin from bommekijn ('little barrel') 
 Bundle  from Middle Dutch bondel or perhaps a merger of this word and Old English byndele ('binding') 
 Bung  from Middle Dutch bonge (="stopper")
 Buoy from boei (="shackle" or "buoy") 
 Bush (uncleared district of a British colony)  probably from Dutch bosch, in the same sense, since it seems to appear first in former Dutch colonies

C
 Caboose  from kambuis or kombuis (="ship's kitchen", "galley") 
 Cam  from 18th century Dutch cam (cog of a wheel", originally comb, cognate of English comb) or from English camber (having a slight arch) 
 Cockatoo  from kaketoe 
 Cashier  from Middle Dutch cassier 
 Coleslaw  from 18th century Dutch koolsla (cabbage salad) 
 Commodore  probably from Dutch kommandeur, from French commandeur, from Old French comandeor 
 Cookie  from koekje, or in informal Dutch koekie  (="biscuit", "cookie")
 Coney Island  (English dialect word for Rabbit) from Conyne Eylandt (literally "Rabbit Island"), in modern Dutch konijn and eiland.
 Cramp  (metal bar bent at both ends) from Middle Dutch crampe or Middle Low German krampe.
 Cricket  from Old French criquet 'goal post', 'stick', perhaps from Middle Dutch cricke 'stick, staff'
 Crimp  from Old English gecrympan, perhaps reintroduced from Low German or Dutch krimpen (to shrink)
 Croon  via Scottish, from Middle Dutch kronen (= to lament, mourn)
 Cruise  from Dutch kruisen (="to cross, sail to and fro"), from kruis (="cross") 
 Cruller  from 19th century Dutch krullen (to curl) 

D
 Dam  from Middle Dutch or Middle Low German dam, or from Old Norse dammr 
 Dapper  from Middle Dutch or Middle Low German dapper (bold, sturdy) 
 Deck  from 16th century Middle Dutch dec or dekken (to cover) 
 Decoy  possibly from 16th century Dutch de (the) + kooi (cage, used of a pond surrounded by nets, into which wildfowl were lured for capture) . Or from 16th century Dutch "eendekooi" (duck cage; a cage with an artificial duck to lure wild ducks); mistranslated as "een" dekooi; should have been read as "eend (duck)" -e- "kooi (cage)"-> a (article) dekooi -> (a) decoy
 Dock  from Middle Dutch or Middle Low German docke 
 Dollar from Dutch (Rijks)daalder 
 Domineer  from late 16th century Dutch dominieren (to rule), based on Middle French dominer 
 Dope  from American English dope, based on Dutch doop (sauce) or dopen (to dip or to baptise) 
 Dredge  from Scottish dreg-boat (boat for dredging), perhaps based on Middle Dutch dregghe (drag-net) 
 Drill (verb)  from 17th century Dutch drillen 
 Drug  from Old French drogue, based on Middle Dutch droge-vate (dry barrels, with first element mistaken as word for the contents) 
 Dune  from French dune, based on Middle Dutch dune 

E
 Easel  from ezel (=originally (and still) "donkey"; "(schilders)ezel"=easel, lit. "painter's donkey") 
 Elope  from ontlopen (run away) 
 Etch  from Dutch ets or etsen 
 Excise (noun)  (="tax on goods") from Middle Dutch excijs, apparently altered from accijns (="tax"); English got the word, and the idea for the tax, from the Netherlands. 

F
 Filibuster  from Spanish filibustero from French flibustier ultimately from Dutch vrijbuiter (="pirate" or "freebooter") 
 Flushing, Queens  from Vlissingen, a city in the Netherlands
 Foist  from Dutch vuisten (="take in hand"), from Middle Dutch vuist (="fist") 
 Forlorn hope  from verloren hoop (literally "lost heap or group", figuratively "suicide mission," "cannon fodder")  Forlorn also has identical cognates in German and the Scandinavian languages.
 Fraught  from vrecht, vracht 
 Freebooter  from vrijbuiter 
 Freight  from vracht 
 Frolic  from vrolijk (="cheerful") 
 Furlough  from verlof (="permission (to leave)") 

G
 Galoot  (="awkward or boorish man"), originally a sailor's contemptuous word (="raw recruit, green hand") for soldiers or marines, of uncertain origin; "Dictionary of American Slang" proposes galut, Sierra Leone creole form of Spanish galeoto (="galley slave"); perhaps rather Dutch slang kloot (="testicle"), klootzak (="scrotum"), used figuratively as an insult 
 Gas  from gas, a neologism from Jan Baptista van Helmont, derived from the Greek chaos 
 Geek  from geck (gek) (="fool")  
 Gherkin  from Dutch plural of gurk "cucumber", shortened form of East Frisian augurk 
 Gimp (cord or thread)  from Dutch gimp 
 Gin  from jenever 
 Gnu  from gnoe, earlier t’gnu, from a Khoikhoi word
 Golf  from kolf (="bat, club," but also a game played with these) 
 Grab  from grijpen (="to seize, to grasp, to snatch") 
 Gruff  from Middle Dutch or Middle Low German grof (="coarse (in quality), thick, large") 
 Guilder  from gulden 

H
 Hale (verb)  (="drag, summon"), from Old Frankonian haler (="to pull, haul"), from Frankonian *halon or Old Dutch halen, both from Proto Germanic 
 Hankering  from Middle Dutch hankeren or Dutch hunkeren 
 Harlem  called after the city of Haarlem near Amsterdam
 Hartebeest  from both Afrikaans (Hartebees) and Dutch (Hartenbeest)
 Hoboken  possibly named after the Flemish town Hoboken, from Middle Dutch Hooghe Buechen or Hoge Beuken (="High Beeches" or "Tall Beeches")
 Howitzer  from Dutch houwitzer, which in turn comes from German Haussnitz and later Haubitze.

 Hoist  possibly from Middle Dutch hijsen 
 Holster  from holster 
 Hooky  from hoekje (=corner) in the sense of "to go around the corner" 
 Hoyden  maybe from heiden (=backwoodsman), from Middle Dutch (=heathen) 

I
 Iceberg probably from Dutch ijsberg (literally 'ice mountain')
 Ietsism from Dutch ietsisme (literally: somethingism) an unspecified faith in an undetermined higher or supernatural power or force
 Isinglass from Dutch huizenblas (No longer used) from Middle Dutch huusblase, from huus sturgeon + blase bladder

J
 Jeer (to deride, to mock)  Perhaps from Dutch gieren "to cry or roar," or German scheren "to plague, vex," literally "to shear"
 Jib (foresail of a ship)  from Dutch gijben (boom or spar of a sailing ship)

K
 Keelhauling  from kielhalen (literally "to haul keel")
 Keeshond  prob. from special use of Kees (nickname corresponding to proper name Cornelis) + hond "dog" 
 Kill (body of water)  from kil from Middle Dutch kille (literally "riverbed") 
 Kink  from kink referring to a twist in a rope 
 Knapsack  from Middle Dutch knapzak (snack + bag) http://www.etymologiebank.nl/trefwoord/knapzak
 Knickerbocker  The pen-name was borrowed from Washington Irving's friend Herman Knickerbocker, and literally means "toy marble-baker." Also, descendants of Dutch settlers to New York are referred to as Knickerbockers and later became used in reference to a style of pants 

L
 Landscape  from 16th century Dutch landschap (land + -ship)
 Leak  possibly from Middle Dutch lekken (to leak, to drip)
 Loiter  from Middle Dutch loteren 
 Luck  from Middle Dutch luc, shortening of gheluc (happiness, good fortune)

M
 Maelstrom  from 17th century Dutch mael + stroom (turning + current), possibly based on Old Norse mal(u)streymur 
 Manikin  from Middle Dutch manneken (little man)
 Mannequin  from French Mannequin, based on Middle Dutch manneken (little man)
 Marshal  from Old French, based on Frankish (Old Dutch) marhskalk Mart  from Middle Dutch markt (market) 
 Measles  possibly from Middle Dutch mazelen (blemish)
 Meerkat  from South African Dutch meer + kat (lake + cat), perhaps an alteration of Hindi markat (ape)
 Morass from Middle Dutch marasch (swamp), partly based on Old French marais (marsh), in modern Dutch: moeras 

N
 Nasty  perhaps from Old French nastre "miserly, envious, malicious, spiteful," or from Dutch nestig "dirty," literally "like a bird's nest."

O
 Offal  possibly from Middle Dutch afval (leftovers, rubbish) 
 Onslaught  From Middle Dutch aanslag (attack') 

P
 Patroon from patroon (="patron") 
 Pickle  c.1440, probably from Middle Dutch pekel 
 Pinkie  Pinkje/Pinkie 
 Pit  the stone of a drupaceous fruit : from pit 
 Plug  from plugge, originally a maritime term.
 Polder  from polder Poppycock  from pappekak (=dialect for "soft dung") 
 Potassium  from potaschen c. 1477 see Potash
 Pump  from pomp 
 Puss  perhaps from early 16th century Dutch poes or Low German puus (pet name for cat), but probably much older than the record, because present in many Indo-European languages. 

Q
 Quack  shortened from quacksalver, from kwakzalver (literally "someone who daubs ointments") 

R
 Roster  from rooster (="schedule, or grating/grill") 
 Rover from rover (="robber") 
 Rucksack  from rugzakS
 Santa Claus  from Middle Dutch Sinterklaas (="Saint Nicholas"), bishop of Minor Asia who became a patron saint for children. (Dutch and Belgian feast celebrated on the 5th and 6 December respectively) (Origins of Santa Claus in US culture)
School (group of fish)  from Dutch school  (group of fish)
 Scone  via Scottish, shortened from Middle Dutch schoonbrood "fine bread", from schoon (bright) + brood (bread) 
 Scow  from schouw (a type of boat) 
 Scum (as in lowest class of humanity) from schuim (froth, foam) 
 Shoal  from Middle Dutch schole (="large number (of fish)") (modern Dutch: school) (etymology not sure)
 Skate  from schaats. The noun was originally adopted as in Dutch, with 'skates' being the singular form of the noun; due to the similarity to regular English plurals this form was ultimately used as the plural while 'skate' was derived for use as singular." 
 Sketch  from schets 
 Scour  from Middle Dutch scuren (now "schuren") , cognate of the English word "shower".
 Skipper  from Middle Dutch scipper (now schipper, literally "shipper") 
 Sled, sleigh  from Middle Dutch slede, slee 
 Slim  "thin, slight, slender," from Dutch slim "bad, sly, clever," from Middle Dutch slim "bad, crooked," 
 Sloop  from sloep 
 Slurp  from slurpen 
 Smack (boat)  possibly from smak "sailboat," perhaps so-called from the sound made by its sails 
 Smearcase  from smeerkaas (="cheese that can be spread over bread, cottage-cheese")
 Smelt  from smelten (="to melt") 
 Smuggler  from Low German smukkelen and Dutch smokkelen (="to transport (goods) illegally"), apparently a frequentative formation of a word meaning "to sneak" 
 Snack  perhaps from Middle Dutch snakken (="to long" (snakken naar lucht="to gasp for air") originally "to eat"/"chatter") 
 Snap  from Middle Dutch or Low German snappen (to bite, seize)
 Snicker from Dutch snikken (="to gasp, sob")
 Snoop  from 19 century Dutch snoepen (to eat (possibly in secret) something sweet) 
 Snuff  from snuiftabak (literally "sniff tobacco") 
 Splinter  from splinter 
 Split  from Middle Dutch splitten 
 Spook  from spook (="ghost(ly image)") 
 Spoor  from both Afrikaans and Dutch spoor (="track"/"trail")
 Stoker  from stoken (="stoke a fire") 
 Still life  from Dutch stilleven 
 Stoop (steps)  from stoep (=road up a dike, usually right-angled) 
 Stockfish  from Dutch stokvis (= "stick fish")
 Stock  from Dutch stok (= "stick"). The Dutch word stok, pronounced similarly, was a wooden stick with carvings taken out of it and then split in half, one half was kept at the stock exchange and the other half was proof that the owner owned a certain amount of stock in something.
 Stove  from Middle Dutch stove (="heated room"). The Dutch word stoof, pronounced similarly, is a small (often wooden) box with holes in it. One would place glowing coals inside so it would emanate heat, and then put one's feet on top of it while sitting (in a chair) to keep one's feet warm. 
 Sutler from zoetelaar (="one who sweetens", sweetener, old-fashioned for "camp cook") 
 Swab From Dutch zwabberT
 Tattoo (military term)  from taptoe (literally "close the tap"). So called because police used to visit taverns in the evening to shut off the taps of casks. 
 Tickle  from kietelen 
 Trigger  from trekker (Trekken ="to pull") 

U
 Upsy-daisy (baby talk extension of up)  from late 17th century Dutch op zijn, and also occasionally as an adverb, "extremely"

V
 Vang  from Dutch vangen (=to catch)
 Veld  from Cape Dutch veldt, used in South African English to describe a field

W
 Waffle (noun)  from Dutch wafel, from Middle Dutch or Middle Low German wafel 
 Walrus  from walrus 
 Wagon  from Dutch wagen, Middle Dutch waghen (= "cart, carriage, wagon") 
 Wentletrap  from Dutch wenteltrap: wentelen (= "winding, spiraling") and trap (= "stairway")
 Wiggle  from wiggelen (= "to wobble, to wiggle") or wiegen (= "to rock") 
 Wildebeest  from Dutch "wilde" (= "wild") and "beest" (= "beast") Wildebeest
 Witloof  from Belgian Dutch witloof (literally wit "white" + loof "foliage"), Dutch witlof 

X

Y
 Yacht  from Dutch jacht, short for jachtschip (literally "hunting ship") 
 Yankee  from Jan Kees'', a personal name, originally used mockingly to describe pro-French revolutionary citizens, with allusion to the small keeshond dog, then for "colonials" in New Amsterdam. This is not the only possible etymology for the word yankee, however; the Oxford English Dictionary has quotes with the term from as early as 1765, quite some time before the French Revolution. Nowadays it commonly refers to Americans from the United States.

Z

See also
Lists of English words of international origin
List of English words of Afrikaans origin
List of place names of Dutch origin
List of South African slang words
List of English Latinates of Germanic origin

References

External links

Online Etymology Dictionary
Alan Hope, "Talk the talk" - article in Flanders Today on the influence of Dutch on other languages
 Low Germanic loanwords in modern English

English
Dutch